In the United Kingdom, the hard left are the left-wing political movements and ideas outside the mainstream centre-left. It is also used as a pejorative term for the left-wing of the Labour Party.

Term 
The term was first used in the context of debates within both the Labour Party and the broader left in the 1980s to describe Trotskyist groups such as the Militant tendency, Socialist Organiser and Socialist Action. Within the party, the "hard left", represented by the Campaign Group, subscribed to more strongly socialist views while the "soft left", associated for example with the Tribune Group, embraced more moderate social democratic ideas. 

Politicians commonly described as being on the hard left of the Labour Party at the time included Tony Benn, Derek Hatton, Ken Livingstone, Dennis Skinner, and Eric Heffer.

The term has since then often been used pejoratively by Labour's political opponents, for example, during the Conservative Party's election campaigns of the early 1990s, and by the media.

See also 
 Far-right
 Loony left
 Soft left

References

Further reading 
 Charlie Kimber. Waiting for Lefty. Socialist Review. 1997.

Left-wing politics
Politics of Australia
Politics of the United Kingdom
Left-wing politics in the United Kingdom
Labour Party (UK) factions